Hélène Masson-Maret (born 7 April 1947) is a member of the Senate of France, representing the Alpes-Maritimes department. She is a member of the Union for a Popular Movement.

References
Page on the Senate website

1947 births
People from Alpes-Maritimes
Living people
Union for a Popular Movement politicians
French Senators of the Fifth Republic
Women members of the Senate (France)
21st-century French women politicians
Senators of Alpes-Maritimes